Patibandla is a village in the Guntur district of the Indian state of Andhra Pradesh. It is located in Pedakurapadu mandal of Guntur revenue division.

Government and politics 

Patibandla gram panchayat is the local self-government of the village. It is divided into wards and each ward is represented by a ward member. The ward members are headed by a Sarpanch.

Education 

As per the school information report for the academic year 2018–19, the village has a total of 4 schools. These include one Mandal Parishad and 3 private schools.

Education 
It has a heritage school called RCM High School.

Notable people 
Gali Bali, the present Bishop of Guntur diocese

See also 
List of villages in Guntur district

References 

Villages in Guntur district